The Tuscaloosa Symphony Orchestra (TSO) is an orchestra based in Tuscaloosa, Alabama, United States.  It celebrated its twenty-fifth season during 2006–2007. The orchestra performs at the Moody Music Building on the campus of the University of Alabama in Tuscaloosa.

The musical director of the TSO is Adam Flatt.  Korean maestro Shinik Hahm was music director from 2001 to 2010.

See also
 Alabama Symphony Orchestra
 Huntsville Symphony Orchestra
 The Mobile Symphony

References

External links
Tuscaloosa Symphony Orchestra

American orchestras
Musical groups from Alabama
Buildings and structures in Tuscaloosa, Alabama
Tourist attractions in Tuscaloosa, Alabama
Musical groups established in 1981
Performing arts in Alabama